Cookstown railway station was one of two stations serving Cookstown in  County Tyrone in Northern Ireland.

The Great Northern Railway opened the station on 28 August 1879 as the terminus of a branch from Dungannon.

The Great Northern Railway (GNR) was the second railway company to reach Cookstown- In 1856 the Belfast and Ballymena Railway opened a branch line to the town by way of Randalstown and Magherafelt. Though located next door to the BBR station on Molesworth Street, the GNR station was completely separate. A rail connection between the two stations existed, but for transfer of goods wagons only. There were no through passenger workings.

It was closed to passengers by the Great Northern Railway Board on 16 January 1956 and to goods on 5 October 1959.

The station building was designed by William Henry Mills in his typical polychrome style, with red and yellow Flemish-bond brickwork. After closure it became Council property, and listed in 1975. Today, it is used as by the town's hockey club. Two further GNR railway buildings survive in Cookstown, along with the goods shed (also listed) in use by the Council and a gate archway bearing the name ''Great Northern''. The arch inspired a similar design at the Downpatrick and County Down Railway.

Routes

References

Disused railway stations in County Tyrone
Railway stations opened in 1879
Railway stations closed in 1956
Railway stations in Northern Ireland opened in the 19th century